Dinwoodey is a surname. Notable people with this surname include:

 Annette Richardson Dinwoodey (1906–2007), American radio singer
 Dean Dinwoodey (1899–1983), American intellectual

See also
 Dinwoodie (disambiguation)